is a train station in Muroran, Hokkaidō, Japan.

Lines
Hokkaido Railway Company
Muroran Main Line Station M35

Adjacent stations

Railway stations in Hokkaido Prefecture
Railway stations in Japan opened in 1935